The 2008 Speedway Conference League was the third tier/division of British speedway.

Summary
The title was won by Weymouth Wildcats who won the playoffs.

Final league table

Play-offs

Conference League Knockout Cup
The 2008 Conference League Knockout Cup was the 11th edition of the Knockout Cup for tier three teams. Plymouth Devils were the winners.

First round

Semi-finals

Final

Other Honours
Conference Trophy - Plymouth 94 Boston 88
Conference league pairs - 1st Boston; 2nd Redcar
Conference league fours - Weymouth 13, Redcar 12, Sittingbourne 7, Scunthorpe 4
Conference League Riders' Championship - Benji Compton (Redcar)

See also
List of United Kingdom Speedway League Champions

References

Conference
Speedway Conference League